Phoberus consimilis is a species of hide beetle in the subfamily Troginae.

References

consimilis
Beetles described in 1953